Charles Orson F. Wright (April 13, 1873 – March 28, 1922) was a provincial politician from Alberta, Canada. He served as a member of the Legislative Assembly of Alberta from 1921 to his death in 1922 sitting with the United Farmers caucus in government.

Political career
Wright ran for a seat to the Albert Legislature in the 1921 Alberta general election as a United Farmers candidate. He defeated incumbent James Turgeon to pick up the Ribstone electoral district for his party.

Wright died on March 28, 1922 after suffering from pneumonia at Royal Alexandra Hospital in Edmonton, Alberta. He was Charles Stewart's brother in law.

References

External links
Legislative Assembly of Alberta Members Listing

1922 deaths
United Farmers of Alberta MLAs
1873 births